O Trem da Morte (also known as A Metralha no Sertão Paulista and Coluna da Morte) is a 1924 Brazilian film directed by José del Picchia, and starring Olga Navarro. It was produced by Hélios Filme. It is a semidocumentary film, which use real scenes, of the Revolution of 1924—a lieutenant revolt in São Paulo.

The film premiered on 5 December 1924 in São Paulo.

Cast
Arturo Carrari   
José Carrari   
Carmo Nacarato   
Olga Navarro   
Nicola Tartaglione as  João Cabanas

References

External links
 

1924 drama films
1924 films
Brazilian black-and-white films
Brazilian silent films